The 2023 Thailand Masters (officially known as the Princess Sirivannavari Thailand Masters 2023 for sponsorship reasons) was a badminton tournament that took place at the Nimibutr Stadium, Bangkok, Thailand, from 31 January to 5 February 2023 and had a total prize of US$210,000.

Tournament
The 2023 Thailand Masters was the fourth tournament of the 2023 BWF World Tour and was part of the Thailand Masters championships, which had been held since 2016. This tournament was organized by the Badminton Association of Thailand with sanction from the BWF.

Venue
This international tournament was held at the Nimibutr Stadium in Bangkok, Thailand.

Point distribution
Below is the point distribution table for each phase of the tournament based on the BWF points system for the BWF World Tour Super 300 event.

Prize pool 
The total prize money was US$210,000 with the distribution of the prize money in accordance with BWF regulations.

Men's singles

Seeds

 Kunlavut Vitidsarn (withdrew)
 Lu Guangzu (withdrew)
 Lee Cheuk Yiu (quarter-finals)
 Ng Ka Long (final)
 Kenta Nishimoto (quarter-finals)
 Li Shifeng (semi-finals)
 Brian Yang (first round)
 Ng Tze Yong (quarter-finals)

Finals

Top half

Section 1

Section 2

Bottom half

Section 3

Section 4

Women's singles

Seeds

 Ratchanok Intanon (withdrew)
 Carolina Marín (withdrew)
 Busanan Ongbamrungphan (withdrew)
 Han Yue (final)
 Pornpawee Chochuwong (withdrew)
 Line Kjærsfeldt (quarter-finals)
 Zhang Yiman (champion)
 Kim Ga-eun (quarter-finals)

Finals

Top half

Section 1

Section 2

Bottom half

Section 3

Section 4

Men's doubles

Seeds

 Satwiksairaj Rankireddy / Chirag Shetty (withdrew)
 Ong Yew Sin / Teo Ee Yi (withdrew)
 Muhammad Shohibul Fikri / Bagas Maulana (semi-finals)
 Leo Rolly Carnando / Daniel Marthin (champions)
 He Jiting / Zhou Haodong (first round)
 Pramudya Kusumawardana / Yeremia Rambitan (quarter-finals)
 Ren Xiangyu / Tan Qiang (first round)
 Jeppe Bay / Lasse Mølhede (withdrew)

Finals

Top half

Section 1

Section 2

Bottom half

Section 3

Section 4

Women's doubles

Seeds

 Jongkolphan Kititharakul / Rawinda Prajongjai (second round)
 Benyapa Aimsaard / Nuntakarn Aimsaard (champions)
 Treesa Jolly / Gayatri Gopichand (first round)
 Febriana Dwipuji Kusuma / Amalia Cahaya Pratiwi (second round)
 Li Wenmei / Liu Xuanxuan (semi-finals)
 Liu Shengshu / Zhang Shuxian (second round)
 Rui Hirokami / Yuna Kato (quarter-finals)
 Ng Tsz Yau / Tsang Hiu Yan (first round)

Finals

Top half

Section 1

Section 2

Bottom half

Section 3

Section 4

Mixed doubles

Seeds

 Tan Kian Meng / Lai Pei Jing (withdrew)
 Goh Soon Huat / Shevon Jemie Lai (second round)
 Supak Jomkoh / Supissara Paewsampran (second round)
 Rehan Naufal Kusharjanto / Lisa Ayu Kusumawati (second round)
 Seo Seung-jae / Chae Yoo-jung (final)
 Feng Yanzhe / Huang Dongping (champions)
 Terry Hee / Jessica Tan (first round)
 Ishaan Bhatnagar / Tanisha Crasto (second round)

Finals

Top half

Section 1

Section 2

Bottom half

Section 3

Section 4

References

External links
 Tournament Link

Thailand Masters
Badminton, World Tour, Thailand Masters
Badminton, World Tour, Thailand Masters
Thailand Masters (badminton)
Thailand Masters
Thailand Masters